Ptiliola is a genus of beetles belonging to the family Ptiliidae.

The species of this genus are found in Europe and Northern America.

Species:
 Ptiliola brevicollis (Matthews, 1860) 
 Ptiliola collani (Mäklin, 1853)

References

Ptiliidae